Barrama is a genus of moths in the family Geometridae. It contains only the Barrama impunctata species.

References

Oenochrominae